Ayanda Kota is an activist who was the founding chairperson of the Unemployed Peoples' Movement in Grahamstown, South Africa. He is also the President of the Makana Football Association. His political roots are in the black consciousness movement and he is strongly critical of the ruling African National Congress. He is currently the organiser for the Unemployed People's Movement.

Arrest and assault

On 12 January 2012 he was arrested on a charge of theft after failing to return three books that he had borrowed from a local academic institution. He was subject to police assault while in custody. A number of organisations issued statements in response to the arrest. Kota later stated that he had misplaced the books in question and had repeatedly offered to replace them and that this offer had been clearly communicated to the police.

All charges against Kota were withdrawn a month after the arrest.

In October 2016 the Minister of Police admitted that the assault had taken place and agreed to pay Kota R250 00 in compensation.

Role during 2015 xenophobia crisis

In October 2015 Grahamstown was wracked by serious xenophobic violence. Kota played a key role in grassroots work to oppose xenophobia.

Publications
Some of his published articles are:
 SA, we cannot say we are free, Ayanda Kota, Afro-Spear, 2011
 Malema does not speak for poor youths, Ayanda Kota, Mail & Guardian, 2011
 Secrecy Bill shows ANC's historic mission is over, Ayanda Kota, Mail & Guardian, December 2011
 ANC centenary a display of elite power, Ayanda Kota, Links, January 2012
 Time for radical action on the unemployment crisis, Ayanda Kota, Pambazuka, 17 May 2012
 Apartheid petty and grand, old and new is evil, Ayanda Kota, Pambazuka, 26 April 2012
 The Marikana mine workers massacre: a massive escalation in the war on the poor, Ayanda Kota, San Francisco Bay View, 18 August 2012
 Biko’s struggle goes on, Ayanda Kota, Grocott's Mail, 12 September 2013
 Don’t vote for these messiahs, Ayanda Kota, GroundUp, 2 April 2014
 In Memory of Comrade Nkosi Molala - Honorary President of the Black Consciousness Movement, Ayanda Kota, GroundUp, 22 September 2016

References

Housing in South Africa
Living people
South African activists
South African communists
Members of the South African Unemployed Peoples' Movement
Year of birth missing (living people)